Ernest Emil Darwin Simon, 1st Baron Simon of Wythenshawe (9 October 1879 – 3 October 1960) was a British industrialist, politician and public servant. Lord Mayor of Manchester in 1921–1922, he was a member of parliament for two terms between 1923 and 1931 before being elevated to the peerage and serving as the Chairman of the BBC Board of Governors.

Early life and family
Simon was born in Didsbury, Manchester, as the eldest son of Henry Gustav Simon and Emily Stoehr. He was educated at Rugby School and studied mechanical sciences at Pembroke College, Cambridge.

In 1912 he married Shena Dorothy Potter (1883–1972), a noted social reformer. They had three children: Roger, a solicitor and journalist; Brian, an educationalist and historian; and a daughter Antonia (Tony) who died in childhood. His nephew is C. G. H. Simon.

Engineering
After leaving Cambridge on the death of his father, he entered the family's engineering business, Simon Carves, manufacturers of flour milling machinery and coke ovens. He successfully expanded the company into building grain silos, and with the wealth generated by the business pursued outside interests, including politics.

Political and public life

Simon served as a member of Manchester City Council from 1912 to 1925, and as Lord Mayor of Manchester in 1921–1922, the youngest person at the time to have held the office. He is chiefly remembered for the slum clearances and housing projects he initiated in the city. He purchased Wythenshawe Hall and park from Robert Henry Grenville Tatton in 1926 and donated them to the city; the estate farmland became one on Britain's largest housing estates, Wythenshawe.

Simon sat as a Liberal Member of Parliament for Manchester Withington from 1923 to 1924 and from 1929 to 1931. Appointed a Parliamentary Secretary to the Ministry of Health in August 1931, to remain in office he contested Penryn and Falmouth (he had previously decided not to contest the Withington seat again) in October 1931, however he was unsuccessful. He was knighted in 1932. After the Second World War he again stood for parliament, as an independent candidate for the Combined English Universities seat during the 1946 by-election. He was unsuccessful and later that year joined the Labour Party. In 1947 he was raised to the peerage as Baron Simon of Wythenshawe, of Didsbury in the City of Manchester, and he was appointed chairman of the BBC Board of Governors, a post which he held until 1952.

He was close friends with Sidney and Beatrice Webb, and he contributed £1000 towards their establishment of the New Statesman political newspaper in 1913. He also had long association with the Victoria University of Manchester; except for a short period, he was a member of the court and council from 1915 until his death, and he served as chairman of the Council between 1941 and 1957.

Simon died on 3 October 1960 in Withington, Manchester, after suffering a stroke whilst on holiday. His eldest son Roger succeeded to the barony.

Publications

References

Further reading

External links 
 
 Faculty of Humanities, Manchester. Brendon Jones, biographical article
 Simon Report of 1944 on Placing and Management of Building Contracts,1944 and on Distribution of Building Materials and Components, 1948

 

1879 births
1960 deaths
People educated at Rugby School
Alumni of Pembroke College, Cambridge
English mechanical engineers
BBC Governors
Chairmen of the BBC
Knights Bachelor
Liberal Party (UK) MPs for English constituencies
UK MPs 1923–1924
UK MPs 1929–1931
UK MPs who were granted peerages
Labour Party (UK) hereditary peers
People from Didsbury
Lord Mayors of Manchester
Councillors in Manchester
Liberal Party (UK) councillors
Engineers from Manchester
Barons created by George VI